Norča is a village located in the municipality of Preševo, Serbia. According to the 2002 census, the village has a population of 992 people. Of these, 979 (98,68 %) were ethnic Albanians, 4 (0,40 %) were Serbs, 3 (0,30 %) were Muslims, and 5 	(0,50 %) others.

References

Populated places in Pčinja District
Albanian communities in Serbia